Yehuda Julio Glantz (born March 19, 1958, in Buenos Aires, Argentina) is a musician, composer, singer, songwriter and producer living in Jerusalem Israel. Named and recognized as Cultural Ambassador of Latin Hebrew Music from Israel to the world. Glantz is a multi-instrumentalist playing on the Charango, piano, accordion, siku, pinkillu, guitar, flute, cuatro and is also a percussionist. Yehuda has twice received the first place award in the klezmer Safed festival for his performance and compositions. In 2008, Yehuda founded the Regalim Festival in the City Center of Jerusalem. The festival takes place during both Sukkoth and Passover holidays and attracts thousands of visitors from around the world.

Biography 
Yehuda Julio Glantz was born and raised in Argentina to secular family. When he was five years old he began studying accordion, and Glantz 's father enrolled him in a music school. At the age of six, Glantz began to sing in the choir of the Max Nordau Synagogue located in Buenos Aires. He began to study violin in the Manuel De Falla Conservatory, simultaneously studying both piano and guitar. At the age of sixteen he started performing with the young band "El Canto de Todos". At the age of seventeen he went to Brazil where he studied harmony and composition on the style of Bossa nova and Samba while mastering both guitar and percussion. At the age of twenty-one Glantz visited Israel for the first time and decided to stay. Shortly after he was granted a Stipend from the Rubin Academy of Music of Jerusalem where he studied piano and composition with Professor Nachum Perperkovich. At the age of twenty-two Glantz adapted various flutes and other Bamboo instruments into his music. He began producing, arranging and composing music in International Latin American Jewish Fusion.

His stay in Israel presented him with many questions about Judaism. Yehuda Julio then began the path of return, thus combining composition with rhythm and instruments from South – America, along with words from the scriptures. He subsequently performed in the United States, Canada, South Africa, Australia, Europe, South America and Israel.

Musical work 
He released an album entitled Golden Organ 1 and 2 in 1985 and Golden Tunes in 1986. In the same year he also released a humor satire album entitled Kasach in honor of the Jewish holiday purim . In 1992 Glantz released the album Pionero, a Spanish album debuting the song Adon Olam. In 1994 the song Na'ale off the album was released and hit number 1 on the Top 10 song lists of many Israeli radio stations, the album sold thousands.  It was then that Glantz began to be published in Diaspora communities worldwide.  In 1996 after witnessing the explosion of a suicide bomber near his home at the Machane Yehuda market place of Jerusalem, Glantz released an album entitled Rak Litzok El Hashem -" Just shout to the Lord.

From 1992 to 2007, Glantz appeared each year at the Chabad Telethon in Hollywood. As a result he met Jerry Weintraub, whose credits include producing the 2001 blockbuster hit remake of Ocean's Eleven. Glantz then appeared in season 2 Episode 7 of the TV series Friends, where he appeared as the "Rabbi playing the electric guitar".

In 2002, Glantz released "Gotta Dance- Muchrachim lircod", a personal album about love, children, and joy. The album's lyrics are based on the Torah teachings and statements of Rabbi Shlomo Carlebach.

In 2005, the first Cellist from the Israel Symphony Orchestra Doron Toister, who knew Glantz, decided to arrange one of Yehuda Glantz's compositions for the Israel Symphony Orchestra. Glantz then produced a performance entitled "Nomade". This performance integrated classical orchestration along with South American instrumentation. A total of 83 musicians performed on stage including a symphony and rhythm section. Glantz alongside Toister worked for 18-month producing the project and in April 2006, premiered with the Israel Symphony Orchestra at the Performing Arts Center of Rishon Lezion.

In 2008 Yehuda Julio Glantz founded the "Festival Regalim" in Jerusalem's City Center. The festival provides a platform for young artists from the neighborhood and internationally consisting of musicians, painters, street performers, actors, authors, and others, who present their creative abilities.

Yehuda released last September the first single "Birkat HaBayit" from the new album. On Chanukah in December 2011 Yehuda release his new album "Chai Vekayam". The album was released first in the digital download edition. In February came the album CD edition.

From 2012 to date, he toured Australia, Egypt, Russia, Turkey, the United States and Argentina. 
At the same time, he is dedicated to the musical production of new internationals talents, among those listed are Omer Adam and with whom he collaborates with songs in spanish.

Since 2014 he has been in the composition, direction and production of Búsqueda Eterna for the music genre "World Music" whose repertoire consists of a variety of different styles and is nourished by musical influences from around the world. With a proposal of universal values and positive attitude this time with songs in Spanish.

In 2018 he toured Japan, offering shows and educational workshops in different universities: Rykkio, Kwansei Gakuin, Ipal and Cultural Centers in Tokyo, Kobe, Osaka, Takamatsu and Kagawa.

In January and February 2019, he spent 2 months recording unpublished material with Argentine folk musicians that will be released in 2020.
On November 8 he was appointed Cultural Ambassador of the Hebrew Latin Music of Israel to the World , receiving a certificate of honor and recognition for his extensive international career.

Discography 

Albums
 "Chai Vekayam", 2012
 "Nomade", 2007
 "Gotta dance", 2002
 "Granite", 1999
 "Adon Olam", 1998
 "Unplugged", 1998
 "Rak Litzok el Hashem", 1996
 "Na'ale", 1994
 "Pionero", (pioneer), 1992
 "Live in South America", 1990
 "Kasach", 1986
 "The Sound of Gold", 1986
 "Golden Tunes", 1985

References

External links 

Bandpage
Yehuda Glantz 2010 Sidney & Melbourne Australia
Yehuda Glantz Sings Nafshi  (14,12,2010)
Article in The Jerusalem Post On the new album (2,2,2012)
Review of Yehuda Glantz's Album Chai Vekayam (27,3,2012)
Chay Vekayam Video Clip

1958 births
Living people
Jewish Argentine musicians
Jewish songwriters
Hasidic entertainers
Hasidic singers
Argentine emigrants to Israel
Israeli Orthodox Jews
20th-century Israeli male singers
Singers from Buenos Aires
Jewish folk singers
21st-century Israeli male singers